The Big Nine Conference, formerly the Big Eight Conference, was a high school sports conference in Genesee County, Michigan, that ended with four high schools in 2012.

History
Formed in 1960 as the Big Eight Conference, the conference became the Big Nine Conference in 1962 with the addition of Mt. Morris High School.  Ainsworth High School left in 1968, and Mt. Morris left in 1972. Powers Catholic High School joined in 1974. In 1976, Carman High School and Swartz Creek High School were added from the Flint Metro League, giving the conference its peak membership of 10. Due to the collegiate Big Ten Conference, the conference's name remained the Big Nine Conference.

Membership in the Big Nine remained stable for the next 21 years, with only the newly merged Carman-Ainsworth taking Carman's place in the conference in 1986. Owosso High School left in 1997 for the Mid-Michigan Athletic Conference - A. Beecher left the league after the 2002 season. In 2003, the Owosso Trojans returned to the league after the Mid-Michigan Athletic Conference - A dispersed.

Clio in 2005 and Swartz Creek in 2006 moved to the Flint Metro League as the conference was perceived as being overpowering to those schools.

In 2006, the entire Big Nine Conference applied for membership in the Flint Metro League to encourage discussion on a merger.  As a result of that and Kearsley's interest back in 2005–2006, a membership invitation was extended to Kearsley. In 2007, Owosso left for the Capital Area Activities Conference - Red.

Grand Blanc Schools moved to the Kensington Lakes Activities Association starting in the 2009–2010 season.
In August 2011, the remaining Big Nine members and Flint Northwestern High applied together to join the Saginaw Valley League and were accepted to join starting in the 2012–2013 school year, forming Saginaw Valley's southern division with the other Flint City District High Schools.

Membership
The conference had 13 different members over the course of its history.  Of the 11 existing former members, four are in the Flint Metro League, three are in the Saginaw Valley League, two are in the Genesee Area Conference, one is in the Kensington Lakes Activities Association, and one is in the Capital Area Activities Conference.

Timeline

References

Michigan high school sports conferences